A digraph or digram (from the  , "double" and  , "to write") is a pair of characters used in the orthography of a language to write either a single phoneme (distinct sound), or a sequence of phonemes that does not correspond to the normal values of the two characters combined.

Some digraphs represent phonemes that cannot be represented with a single character in the writing system of a language, like the English sh in ship and fish. Other digraphs represent phonemes that can also be represented by single characters. A digraph that shares its pronunciation with a single character may be a relic from an earlier period of the language when the digraph had a different pronunciation, or may represent a distinction that is made only in certain dialects, like the English wh. Some such digraphs are used for purely etymological reasons, like rh in English.

Digraphs are used in some Romanization schemes, like the zh often used to represent the Russian letter ж. As an alternative to digraphs, orthographies and Romanization schemes sometimes use letters with diacritics, like the Czech and Slovak š, which has the same function as the English digraph sh, like the Romanian Ț, which has the same function as the Slavic C, the letter Ť that is used in Czech and Slovak, which has the same function as the Hungarian digraph Ty, and the letter with the cedilla in a few Turkic languages that have the same function as the letter with the cedilla below followed by the letter h in English, for example, ç will become ch in English, and ş will become sh in English.

In some languages' orthographies, digraphs (and occasionally trigraphs) are considered individual letters, which means that they have their own place in the alphabet and cannot be separated into their constituent graphemes when sorting, abbreviating or hyphenating words. Examples of this are found in Hungarian (cs, dz, dzs, gy, ly, ny, sz, ty, zs), Czech (ch), Slovak (ch, dz, dž), Albanian (dh, gj, ll, nj, rr, sh, th, xh, zh), Gaj's Latin alphabet (lj, nj, dž), and in Uzbek (sh, ch, ng). Kazakh also used a form of the Latin alphabet where there are a few digraphs and one tetragraph, specifically the 2018 version of the Kazakh latin alphabet (sh, ch, shch, ıo), and there is still one digraph in the new version of the Latin alphabet (şç). In Dutch, when the digraph ĳ is capitalized, both characters are written in uppercase form (Ĳ).  In the Māori language, there are two digraphs in the language that are still part of the alphabet, which is ng and wh. In Welsh, there are eight digraphs that exist in the official alphabet (ch, dd, ff, ng, ll, ph, rh, th).

In Maltese, there are two digraphs part of the official alphabet (għ and ie). Romanization of the Cyrillic alphabet, especially those used in some Slavic languages, including Russian, resulted in some letters sometimes becoming digraphs, which are the letters (ё, ж, х, ц, ч, ш, щ, ю, я) and can be transliterated into (jo/yo, zh, kh, ts, ch, sh, shch, yu/ju, ya/ja), while sometimes romanizing the letters is done by adding diacritics, except for kh and ts, which for kh, sometimes becoming ch or x, and ts sometimes become c (ë, ž, č, š), still with some digraphs (šč, ju/yu, ja/ya). The Czech alphabet used to have a lot of digraphs a few hundred years ago, but through evolution, those digraphs eventually became letters with diacritics, although the Czech language still kept some as those letters with diacritics cannot make the pronunciations of the respective digraphs (ch, dz, dž), which is also the same case with the Slovak alphabet, having a lot of digraphs in the alphabet, and then evolving to become a diacritical letter, and keeping some when the diacritical letters can't make the pronunciation of the respective digraphs.

Digraphs may develop into ligatures, but this is a distinct concept: a ligature involves a graphical combination of two characters, as when a and e are fused into æ, and as when o and e are fused into œ. Those two ligatures are still used in some languages. Æ is usually used in Scandinavian languages, specifically Icelandic, Norwegian, and Danish. Swedish used to have the letter Æ, but this letter has been changed to Ä. Œ is usually used in French, but is usually typed in two keystrokes (OE/oe), instead of a special key in the French keyboard or using the AltGr key. In Canada, the keyboard layout (Canadian Multilingual Standard) is modified so that it can use the right Ctrl key to get more characters, including the œ and other foreign characters, sometimes a dead key to input a few kinds of diacritics on some letters to type in the language that use the diacritic in question. The digraph ĳ is a special case, especially in Dutch, as when it is handwritten, the capital version (Ĳ) becomes very similar if not indistinguishable to the cursive letter Y, but if it is written in the regular, lower case version, it will look like a Y with a diaeresis/umlaut (ÿ).

Double letters

Digraphs may consist of two different characters (heterogeneous digraphs) or two instances of the same character (homogeneous digraphs). In the latter case, they are generally called double (or doubled) letters.

Doubled vowel letters are commonly used to indicate a long vowel sound.

Doubled consonant letters can also be used to indicate a long or geminated consonant sound. In Italian, for example, consonants written double are pronounced longer than single ones. This was the original use of doubled consonant letters in Old English, but during the Middle English and Early Modern English period, phonemic consonant length was lost and a spelling convention developed in which a doubled consonant serves to indicate that a preceding vowel is to be pronounced short. In rare cases, doubled consonant letters represent a true geminate consonant in modern English; this may occur when two instances of the same consonant come from different morphemes, for example  in unnatural (un+natural).

In some cases, the sound represented by a doubled consonant letter is distinguished in some other way than length from the sound of the corresponding single consonant letter:
In Welsh and Greenlandic,  stands for a voiceless lateral consonant, while in Spanish and Catalan it stands for a palatal consonant.
In several languages of western Europe, including English, French, Portuguese and Catalan, the digraph  is used between vowels to represent the voiceless sibilant , since an  alone between vowels normally represents the voiced sibilant .
In Spanish, Catalan, and Basque,  is used between vowels for the alveolar trill , since an  alone between vowels represents an alveolar flap  (the two are different phonemes in those languages).
In Spanish, the digraph  formerly indicated  (a palatal nasal); it developed into the letter ñ.

Pan-dialectical digraphs
Some languages have a unified orthography with digraphs that represent distinct pronunciations in different dialects (diaphonemes). For example, in Breton there is a digraph  that represents  in most dialects, but  in Vannetais.

Split digraphs

The pair of letters making up a phoneme are not always adjacent. This is the case with English silent e. For example, the sequence a_e has the sound  in English cake. This is the result of three historical sound changes: cake was originally , the open syllable  came to be pronounced with a long vowel, and later the final schwa dropped off, leaving . Later still, the vowel  became . There are six such digraphs in English, .

However, alphabets may also be designed with discontinuous digraphs.

The Indic alphabets are distinctive for their discontinuous vowels, such as Thai เ...อ  in เกอ . Technically, however, they may be considered diacritics, not full letters; whether they are digraphs is thus a matter of definition.

Ambiguous letter sequences

Some letter pairs should not be interpreted as digraphs but appear because of compounding: hogshead and cooperate. They are often not marked in any way and so must be memorized as exceptions. Some authors, however, indicate it either by breaking up the digraph with a hyphen, as in hogs-head, co-operate, or with a trema mark, as in coöperate, but the use of the diaeresis has declined in English within the last century. When it occurs in names such as Clapham, Townshend and Hartshorne, it is never marked in any way. Positional alternative glyphs may help to disambiguate in certain cases: when round,  was used as a final variant of long , and the English digraph resembling  would always be .

In romanization of Japanese, the constituent sounds (morae) are usually indicated by digraphs, but some are indicated by a single letter, and some with a trigraph. The case of ambiguity is the syllabic ん, which is written as n (or sometimes m), except before vowels or y where it is followed by an apostrophe as n’. For example, the given name じゅんいちろう is romanized as Jun’ichirō, so that it is parsed as "Jun-i-chi-rou", rather than as "Ju-ni-chi-rou". A similar use of the apostrophe is seen in pinyin where 嫦娥 is written Chang'e because the g belongs to the final (-ang) of the first syllable, not to the initial of the second syllable. Without the apostrophe, Change would be understood as the syllable chan (final -an) followed by the syllable ge (initial g-).

In several Slavic languages, e.g. Czech, double letters may appear in compound words, but they are not considered digraphs. Examples: bezzubý ‘toothless’, cenný ‘valuable’, černooký ‘black-eyed’.

In alphabetization
In some languages, certain digraphs and trigraphs are counted as distinct letters in themselves, and assigned to a specific place in the alphabet, separate from that of the sequence of characters that composes them, for purposes of orthography and collation. For example:
In the Czech and Slovak alphabet,  is treated as a distinct letter, coming after  in the alphabet.
In the Danish and Norwegian alphabet, the former digraph , where it appears in older names, is sorted as if it were the letter , which replaced it. 
In the Norwegian alphabet, there are several digraphs and letter combinations representing an isolated sound.
Other Dutch digraphs are never treated as single letters.
In the romanization of several Slavic countries that use the Cyrillic script, letters like ш, ж, and ч might be written as sh, zh and ch, however sometimes the result of the romanization might modify a letter to be a diacritical letter instead of a digraph.
In Maltese, two digraphs are used, għ which comes right after g, and ie which comes right after i.

Most other languages, including English, French, German, Polish, etc., treat digraphs as combinations of separate letters for alphabetization purposes.

Examples

Latin script

English
English has both homogeneous digraphs (doubled letters) and heterogeneous digraphs (digraphs consisting of two different letters). Those of the latter type include the following:

  represents  (velar nasal) as in thing.
  represents  (voiced velar plosive) at the beginning of words (ghost), represents  (voiceless labiodental fricative in enough) or is silent at the end of words (sigh).
  represents  (voiceless labiodental fricative), as in siphon.
  represents English  in words of Greek origin, such as rhythm.
  represents  (voiceless postalveolar fricative), as in sheep.
  usually represents  word-medially before a vowel, as in education.
See also Pronunciation of English .
  represents  in words transliterated from Slavic languages, and in American dictionary pronunciation spelling.
  usually appears as  before vowels, like in facial and artificial.
  represents . Originally, it stood for a labialized sound, while  without  was non-labialized, but the distinction has been lost in most dialects, the two sounds merging into a single alveolar approximant, allophonically labialized at the start of syllables, as in red . See also rhotic consonant.

Digraphs may also be composed of vowels. Some letters  are preferred for the first position, others for the second . The latter have allographs  in English orthography.

Other languages using the Latin alphabet
In Serbo-Croatian:
Note that in the Cyrillic orthography, those sounds are represented by single letters (љ, њ, џ).

In Czech and Slovak:

In Danish and Norwegian:
 The digraph  represented  until 1917 in Norway and 1948 in Denmark, but is today spelt . The digraph is still used in older names, but sorted as if it were the letter with the diacritic mark.

In Norwegian, several sounds can be represented only by a digraph or a combination of letters. They are the most common combinations, but extreme regional differences exists, especially those of the eastern dialects. A noteworthy difference is the aspiration of rs in eastern dialects, where it corresponds to skj and sj. Among many young people, especially in the western regions of Norway and in or around the major cities, the difference between ç  and ʃ has been completely wiped away and are now pronounced the same.

  represents  as in ch in German ich or x in México.
  represents  as in ch in German ich or x in México.
  represents  as in sh in English she.
  represents  as in sh in English she.
  represents  (before i or y) as in sh in English she. 
  represents  as in ng in English thing.

In Catalan:
  represents  (palatal lateral approximant)
  represents  (palatal nasal)
  represents  (post-alveolar trill)
  represents  (voiceless alveolar retracted sibilant)
  represents  (voiceless velar plosive)
  represents  (voiced velar plosive)
 postvocalic  represents  (voiceless postalveolar fricative) in Eastern dialects, in Western dialects it represents /jʃ/.

In Dutch:

  represents  (velar nasal)
  represents  (voiceless velar fricative)
  represents  (voiceless postalveolar fricative)
  represents  (close front unrounded vowel)
  represents  (close back rounded vowel)
  represents  (close-mid front rounded vowel)

In French:
  represents  (voiceless postalveolar fricative)
  represents  (palatal nasal)
  represents  (voiceless velar stop), typically before historic front vowels
{| class="wikitable"
|+ French vocalic digraphs
|
!style="text-align:center"| 
!style="text-align:center"| 
|-
!style="text-align:left"| 
|  –  ||  – 
|-
!style="text-align:left"| 
|  –  ||  – 
|-
!style="text-align:left"| 
|  –  ||  – 
|}
See also French phonology.

In German:
  represents  (voiceless velar plosive)
  represents  (open front unrounded vowel) followed by (near-close near-front unrounded vowel)
  represents  (open-mid back rounded vowel) followed by (near-close near-front rounded vowel)

In Hungarian:
  represents  (voiceless postalveolar affricate)
  represents  (voiced postalveolar fricative)
  represents  (voiced palatal plosive)
  represents  (palatal nasal)
  represents  (voiceless palatal plosive)
  represents  (voiced postalveolar affricate)
  represents  (voiceless alveolar fricative) ( is pronounced )
 The Hungarian alphabet additionally contains also a trigraph,  .

In Italian:
  represents , palatal lateral approximant, before -i (with some exceptions)
  represents  (palatal nasal)

In Manx Gaelic,  represents , but  represents .

In Polish:

In Portuguese:
⟨qu⟩ usually represents /k/ (voiceless velar stop)

In Spanish:
  is traditionally (but now usually not) pronounced /ʎ/
  represents  (voiceless postalveolar affricate). Since 2010, neither is considered part of the alphabet. They used to be sorted as separate letters, but a reform in 1994 by the Spanish Royal Academy has allowed that they be split into their constituent letters for collation.

In Welsh:
  represents  (velar nasal), the same sound as in English (but in some words is pronounced ).
  represents  (voiceless uvular fricative)
  represents  (voiceless alveolar trill), pronounced roughly like the combination hr.
  represents  (voiceless interdental fricative)
  represents  (voiced dental fricative), like the English  in then (but is pronounced as voiceless in many contexts).
  represents  (voiceless labiodental fricative), like English , since Welsh  is pronounced  like an English .
  represents  (voiceless alveolar lateral fricative)
The digraphs listed above represent distinct phonemes and are treated as separate letters for collation purposes.

In Yoruba:

Cyrillic

In Russian, the sequences  and  do occur (mainly in loanwords) but are pronounced as combinations of an implosive (sometimes treated as an affricate) and a fricative; implosives are treated as allophones of the plosive /d̪/ and so those sequences are not considered to be digraphs. Cyrillic has few digraphs unless it is used to write non-Slavic languages, especially Caucasian languages.

Arabic script
Because vowels are not generally written, digraphs are rare in abjads like Arabic. For example, if sh were used for š, then the sequence sh could mean either ša or saha. However, digraphs are used for the aspirated and murmured consonants (those spelled with h-digraphs in Latin transcription) in languages of South Asia such as Urdu that are written in the Arabic script by a special form of the letter h, which is used only for aspiration digraphs, as can be seen with the following connecting (kh) and non-connecting (ḍh) consonants:

{|
|Urdu||colspan=2|connecting||  ||colspan=3|non-connecting
|-
|digraph:|| کھا || || ||ڈھا || ||
|-
|sequence: ||کہا |||| ||ڈہا ||||
|}

Armenian
In the Armenian language, the digraph ու  transcribes , a convention that comes from Greek.

Georgian
The Georgian alphabet uses a few digraphs to write other languages.

Greek
Modern Greek has the following digraphs:
αι (ai) represents 
ει (ei) represents 
οι (oi) represents 
ου (oy) represents 
υι (yi) represents 

They are called "diphthongs" in Greek; in classical times, most of them represented diphthongs, and the name has stuck.

γγ (gg) represents  or 
τσ (ts) represents the affricate 
τζ (tz) represents the affricate 
Initial γκ (gk) represents 
Initial μπ (mp) represents 
Initial ντ (nt) represents 

Ancient Greek also had the "diphthongs" listed above although their pronunciation in ancient times is disputed. In addition, Ancient Greek also used the letter γ combined with a velar stop to produce the following digraphs:

γγ (gg) represents 
γκ (gk) represents 
γχ (gkh) represents 

Tsakonian has a few additional digraphs:
ρζ (rz)  (historically perhaps a fricative trill)
κχ (kkh) represents 
τθ (tth) represents 
πφ (pph) represents 
σχ (skh) represents 
In addition, palatal consonants are indicated with the vowel letter ι, which is, however, largely predictable.

Hebrew
The single-character digraphs are called "ligatures" in Unicode.  may also be used following a consonant to indicate palatalization in Slavic loanwords.

Indic
Most Indic scripts have compound vowel diacritics that cannot be predicted from their individual elements. That can be illustrated with Thai in which the diacritic เ, pronounced alone , modifies the pronunciation of other vowels:

{|
|single vowel sign: ||กา ||, ||เก ||, ||กอ ||
|-
|vowel sign plus เ: ||เกา ||, ||แก ||, ||เกอ ||
|}

Inuit
Inuktitut syllabics adds two digraphs to Cree:
rk for q ᙯ qai, ᕿ qi, ᖁ qu, ᖃ qa, ᖅ q
and
ng for ŋ ᖕ ng
The latter forms trigraphs and tetragraphs.

CJK Characters

Chinese
Several combinations of Chinese characters (Hanzi) formed from two or more different characters that known as digraphs.

Japanese
Two kana may be combined into a CV syllable by subscripting the second; the convention cancels the vowel of the first. That is commonly done for CyV syllables called yōon, as in ひょ (ひよ) hyo . They are not digraphs since they retain the normal sequential reading of the two glyphs. However, some obsolete sequences no longer retain that reading, as in くゎ kwa, ぐゎ gwa, and むゎ mwa, now pronounced ka, ga, ma. In addition, non-sequenceable digraphs are used for foreign loans that do not follow normal Japanese assibilation patterns, such as ティ ti, トゥ tu, チェ tye / che, スェ swe, ウィ wi, ツォ tso, ズィ zi. (See katakana and transcription into Japanese for complete tables.)

Long vowels are written by adding the kana for that vowel, in effect doubling it. However, long ō may be written either oo or ou, as in とうきょう toukyou  'Tōkyō'. For dialects that do not distinguish ē and ei, the latter spelling is used for a long e, as in へいせい heisei  'Heisei'. In loanwords, chōonpu, a line following the direction of the text, as in ビール bīru  bīru 'beer'. With the exception of syllables starting with n, doubled consonant sounds are written by prefixing a smaller version of tsu (written っ and ッ in hiragana and katakana respectively), as in きって kitte 'stamp'. Consonants beginning with n use the kana n character (written ん or ン) as a prefix instead.

There are several conventions of Okinawan kana that involve subscript digraphs or ligatures.

Korean
As was the case in Greek, Korean has vowels descended from diphthongs that are still written with two letters. Those digraphs, ㅐ  and ㅔ  (also ㅒ , ㅖ ), and in some dialects ㅚ  and ㅟ , all end in historical ㅣ .

Hangul was designed with a digraph series to represent the "muddy" consonants: ㅃ , ㄸ , ㅉ , ㄲ , ㅆ , ㆅ ; also ᅇ, with an uncertain value. Those values are now obsolete, but most of the doubled letters were resurrected in the 19th century to write consonants that did not exist when hangul was devised: ㅃ , ㄸ , ㅉ , ㄲ , ㅆ .

Ligatures and new letters

Digraphs sometimes come to be written as a single ligature. Over time, the ligatures may evolve into new letters or letters with diacritics. For example sz became ß in German, and "nn" became ñ in Spanish.

In Unicode
Generally, a digraph is simply represented using two characters in Unicode. However, for various reasons, Unicode sometimes provides a separate code point for a digraph, encoded as a single character.

The DZ and IJ digraphs and the Serbian/Croatian digraphs DŽ, LJ, and NJ have separate code points in Unicode.

{| class="wikitable sortable"
! Two Glyphs
! Digraph
! data-sort-type="number" | Unicode Code Point
! class="unsortable" | HTML
|-
| DZ, Dz, dz
| Ǳ, ǲ, ǳ
| data-sort-value="497"|U+01F1 U+01F2 U+01F3
| &#x1F1; &#x1F2; &#x1F3;
|-
| DŽ, Dž, dž
| Ǆ, ǅ, ǆ
| data-sort-value="452"| U+01C4 U+01C5 U+01C6
| &#x1C4; &#x1C5; &#x1C6;
|-
| IJ, ij
| Ĳ, ĳ
| data-sort-value="306"| U+0132 U+0133
| &#x132; &#x133;
|-
| LJ, Lj, lj
| Ǉ, ǈ, ǉ
| data-sort-value="455"| U+01C7 U+01C8 U+01C9
| &#x1C7; &#x1C8; &#x1C9;
|-
| NJ, Nj, nj
| Ǌ, ǋ, ǌ
| data-sort-value="458"| U+01CA U+01CB U+01CC
| &#x1CA; &#x1CB; &#x1CC;
|-
| th
| ᵺ
| U+1D7A
|
|}
See also Ligatures in Unicode.

See also
Multigraph (orthography)
Trigraph
Tetragraph
Pentagraph
Hexagraph
Bigram
Diphthong
List of Latin letters
Digraph (programming)

References

2